von Bonin is a surname. Notable people with the surname include:

Albert Ferdinand Adolf Karl Friedrich von Bonin (1803–1872), German Corps commander
Bogislaw von Bonin (1908–1980), German Wehrmacht officer and journalist
Cosima von Bonin (born 1962), German contemporary artist
Dietrich-Siegwart von Bonin
Eckart-Wilhelm von Bonin (1919–1992), German World War II night fighter ace
Eduard von Bonin (1793–1865), Prussian general who served as Prussian Minister of War
Hubertus von Bonin (1911–1943), German World War II fighter ace
Kasimir Wedig von Bonin (1691–1752), Prussian lieutenant general 
Gerhardt von Bonin (1890–1979), neuroscientist & co-author of the classic text "The Isocortex of Man" (1951)

See also
Bonin (surname)

Bonin
Bonin
Bonin